Two Gallants is the third full-length studio album from the band Two Gallants, released on September 25, 2007. It follows up their EP, The Scenery of Farewell, which was released in June.

Track listing
 "The Deader"
 "Miss Meri"
 "The Hand That Held Me Down"
 "Trembling of the Rose"
 "Reflections of the Marionette"
 "Ribbons Round My Tongue"
 "Despite What You've Been Told"
 "Fly Low Carrion Crow"
 "My Baby's Gone"

Includes "Liza Jane" as a bonus track on some releases.

References

2007 albums
Two Gallants (band) albums
Saddle Creek Records albums
Albums produced by Alex Newport